William Alexander Julian (August 6, 1870 – May 29, 1949) served as the 28th Treasurer of the United States from June 1, 1933 to May 29, 1949 under Franklin D. Roosevelt and Harry S. Truman. He remains the last man to have served as Treasurer of the United States.

Early life 
Julian was born on August 6, 1870, the son of Alexander and Elizabeth C. (nee Laughlin) Julian. His brother was Henry S. Julian. In 1888, Julian graduated from Dodds College in Frankfort, Kentucky.

Career 

Julian settled in Cincinnati, where he first worked as a bank clerk, then as a shoe manufacturer. Building on the success of his shoe business, he went on to a career in bank management. He declined repeated offers of public office, including Woodrow Wilson's offers of seats on the Federal Trade Commission and the Federal Reserve Board. He ran unsuccessfully for U.S. Senator from Ohio in 1920 and retired from business soon afterward. He appeared as a delegate to the Democratic National Convention from Ohio in 1924, 1932, 1940 and 1948.

As the only Treasurer appointed by Roosevelt, Julian was one of the longest-serving Treasurers, although a distant second to Thomas T. Tucker. During his term the government completed its transition away from the gold standard as a basis for currency by passing the Gold Reserve Act of 1934. Under the act, Julian took custody of the gold that had been confiscated under Executive Order 6102 and held at the Federal Reserve Banks.

Death
On May 29, 1949, Julian died in a car crash in Bethesda, Maryland.

References

External links 

1870 births
1949 deaths
Road incident deaths in Maryland
Treasurers of the United States
Ohio Democrats